Matt Selman (born ) is an American writer and producer.

Early life
Selman is a native of Watertown, Massachusetts.  He graduated from Beaver Country Day School in 1989 and the University of Pennsylvania in 1993.

Career
After considering a career in journalism, he decided to try to become a television writer. After two years of failed spec scripts he was eventually hired to write an episode of Seinfeld in 1996.

The Simpsons
In 1997, Selman joined the writing staff of The Simpsons, where he has remained, rising to the position of executive producer.   He has written or co-written 28 episodes of the show, including "Natural Born Kissers" which the show's creator Matt Groening listed as his eighth favorite episode in 2000., "Behind the Laughter", "Trilogy of Error", "Sky Police" and "The Food Wife". He also co-wrote the 2007 film adaptation of the show, as well as co-writing the video games The Simpsons: Road Rage, The Simpsons Hit and Run and The Simpsons Game.

Selman has won six Primetime Emmy Awards for his work on the show, sharing them with the other producers. Selman received an Annie Award in 1999 for writing "Simpsons Bible Stories". He also won a Writers Guild of America Award in 2004 for writing the episode "The Dad Who Knew Too Little". In the episode, Homer's e-mail was said to be chunkylover53@aol.com. Selman registered the e-mail and received thousands of messages after the episode aired. He responded to some of them in the character of Homer, but gave up when he forgot the password.

Of his writing of The Simpsons, Selman said: "The hardest thing is we have to try and make each episode as good as everything that's come before it. We have a legacy of greatness, and you don't want to be the person that ruins The Simpsons."

As of 2020, he is joint showrunner with Al Jean.

Other journalistic endeavors
Selman formerly wrote for Time.com's Techland "Nerd World" blog alongside Lev Grossman, and is also the creator and writer of the Icebox.com webtoon "Superhero Roommate." Selman also has written jokes for many animated movies. He appeared alongside Groening and voice actor Hank Azaria to judge on a The Simpsons-themed challenge on an episode of Top Chef: Masters in 2010.

Personal life
Selman is married to Renee Ridgeley and they have two daughters.

Credits
Seinfeld (1996) – writer, program consultant
"The Wait Out"
The Simpsons (1997–present) – writer, producer, story editor, supervising producer, executive producer
"Natural Born Kissers" (1998)
"Simpsons Bible Stories" (along with Tim Long and Larry Doyle) (1999)
"They Saved Lisa's Brain" (1999)
"Eight Misbehavin' (1999)
"Behind the Laughter" (along with George Meyer, Tim Long, and Mike Scully) (2000)
"Lisa the Tree Hugger" (2000)
"Trilogy of Error" (2001)
"Simpsons Tall Tales" (2001)
"Jaws Wired Shut" (2002)
"The Dad Who Knew Too Little" (2003)
"All's Fair in Oven War" (2004)
"Pranksta Rap" (2005)
"Future-Drama" (2005)
"Girls Just Want to Have Sums" (2006)
"The Haw-Hawed Couple" (2006)
"Husbands and Knives" (2007)
"That '90s Show" (2008)
"Bart Gets a 'Z' (2009)
"O Brother, Where Bart Thou?" (2009)
"Flaming Moe" (2011)
"The Food Wife" (2011)
"The Day the Earth Stood Cool" (2012)
"Gorgeous Grampa" (2013)
"Covercraft" (2014)
"Sky Police" (2015)
"There Will Be Buds" (2016)
"The Great Phatsby" (along with Dan Greaney) (2017)
"Heartbreak Hotel" (along with Renee Ridgeley) (2018)
"The Clown Stays in the Picture" (2019)
"Treehouse of Horror XXXIII" (2022)
The Simpsons: Road Rage (2001) – co-writer
The Simpsons Hit and Run (2003) – co-writer
The Simpsons Movie (2007) – co-writer
The Simpsons Game (2007) – co-writer

References

External links

Nerd World Blog

Living people
The Daily Pennsylvanian people
Writers Guild of America Award winners
American television writers
American male television writers
Beaver Country Day School alumni
University of Pennsylvania School of Arts and Sciences alumni
Year of birth missing (living people)
Jewish American comedy writers